Flockton is a village in Kirklees, West Yorkshire, England, halfway between Huddersfield, 7 miles (11 km) away and Wakefield, 8 miles (13 km) away. 

It is in the parish of Kirkburton and whilst it is in Kirklees, it has a Wakefield postcode. The name derives from Floki (an Old Norse person's name) and Tūn (which is Old English for enclosure or fence.

It has a population of 1,410 (2006 estimate). Flockton is a commuter village owing to the proximity of the M1 motorway. It extends along the A637 Barnsley Road which brings with it a large amount of traffic.

Flockton is close to Grange Moor. To the west is Flockton Moor, an area containing mainly farm houses. Within the village is Parkside, an area of council housing with most houses terraced and of red-brick. In contrast there are stone-built private developments.  House prices are above average for the area.

Flockton contains a newsagent/convenience store, a hairdressing salon, a junior school, a working men's club, a motorcycle shop, a church, two public houses. The Dartmouth Arms public house was replaced by an Indian restaurant in October 2007. The George and Dragon public house (Now "Jack's") is one of the oldest pubs in England, dating from 1485.

Flockton coal mines
Flockton was within a coal mining area, the local pits are now closed. Locals would also find mining jobs at nearby collieries such as Bullhouse, Emley Moor, or more likely, Caphouse when the local pits were closed due to their inability to compete pricewise with collieries that were connected to the railways.

New Hall Prison
The prison holds female adults, juveniles and young offenders.

Sport
Flockton has a cricket team that plays in the Huddersfield Cricket League. The village football teams play in Huddersfield and District Association Football League leagues.

See also
Listed buildings in Kirkburton

References

External links

Villages in West Yorkshire
Kirkburton